Brachynema is a genus of stinkbugs in the family Pentatomidae.

References 

Pentatomidae genera
Nezarini